The ninth series of Dancing on Ice aired from 5 January to 9 March 2014 on ITV. It was announced on 22 October 2013 that this series would be the show's last, and would be an 'All-Stars' series featuring former winners and previous contestants. Phillip Schofield and Christine Bleakley returned to present, with Jayne Torvill and Christopher Dean returning as mentors. Robin Cousins, Jason Gardiner, Karen Barber and Ashley Roberts returned for their ninth, eighth, seventh and second series on The Ice Panel. Cousins was unable to appear on the ice panel during weeks 6 and 7 due to him commentating the 2014 Winter Olympics in Sochi, Russia and was replaced by original judge Nicky Slater, while Barber acted as head judge.

The competition was won by Ray Quinn with professional partner Maria Filippov.

On 4 September 2017, it was announced on This Morning that Dancing on Ice would return after four years off air.

Couples
The official all-star line-up was revealed on 11 December 2013, while the professional partners were revealed on 17 December 2013.

Scoring chart
{| class="wikitable sortable" style="margin: auto; text-align: center;"
|-
! Couple
! Place
! 1
! 2
! 3
! 4
! 5
! 6
! 7
! 8
! 9
! 10
|-
| style="text-align:left;" |Ray & Maria
| 1
| 
| —
|
|
|
| 
| data-sort-value=80.0|+=
| data-sort-value=79.5|+=
|bgcolor=lightblue|37.0+=77.0
|bgcolor=gold|+=
|-
| style="text-align:left;" |Hayley & Dan
| 2
|25.5
| —
|32.5
|38.0
|
|36.5
| data-sort-value=34.5|34.5+=34.5
| data-sort-value=70.5|+39.0=70.5
|+39.0=
|bgcolor=silver|+=
|-
| style="text-align:left;" |Beth & Łukasz
| 3
| —
| 28.5
|34.0
|36.5
|
|34.5
|data-sort-value=34.0|34.0+=
|data-sort-value=65.0|33.0+={{red|65.0}}
|+37.0=73.5
|bgcolor=tan|+=
|-
| style="text-align:left;" |Sam & Vicky
| 4
| —
| bgcolor=lightblue|30.0
|31.0
|34.5
|bgcolor=lightblue|
|bgcolor=lightblue|31.5
|data-sort-value=74.0|37.0+=74.0
|data-sort-value=74.5 bgcolor=lightblue|36.5+38.0=74.5
|bgcolor=orange|+=
| bgcolor=darkgrey|
|-
| style="text-align:left;" |Kyran & Nina
| 5
| 
| —
|33.0
| bgcolor=lightblue|31.5
|
|33.0
|data-sort-value=66.0 bgcolor=lightblue|+=66.0
|data-sort-value=70.5 bgcolor=orange|34.0+36.5=70.5
| colspan=2 bgcolor=darkgrey|
|-
| style="text-align:left;" |Suzanne & Matt
| 6
| —
|
|31.0
|33.0
|
|32.5
|data-sort-value=37.0 bgcolor=orange|37.0+=37.0
|colspan=5 bgcolor=darkgrey|
|-
| style="text-align:left;" |Gareth & Brianne
| 7
| 
| —
|25.0
|28.0
|
|bgcolor=orange|
|colspan=7 bgcolor=darkgrey|
|-
| style="text-align:left;" |Bonnie & Andrei
| 8
| bgcolor=lightblue|27.5
|—
|28.0
|
|bgcolor=orange|
|colspan=6 bgcolor=darkgrey|
|-
| style="text-align:left;" |Zaraah & Andy
| 9
| —
|30.5
|bgcolor=lightblue|30.0
|bgcolor=orange|32.0
|colspan=6 bgcolor=darkgrey|
|-
| style="text-align:left;" |Todd & Alex
| 10
| —
|
|bgcolor=orange|
|colspan=7 bgcolor=darkgrey|
|-
| style="text-align:left;" |Gary & Katie
| 11
| —
| bgcolor=orange|24.0
| bgcolor=darkgrey colspan=8|
|-
| style="text-align:left;" |David & Frankie
| 12
| —
| bgcolor=lightpink|22.5
| colspan=8 bgcolor=darkgrey|
|-
| style="text-align:left;" |Joe & Robin
| 13
|bgcolor=orange|23.5
|bgcolor=darkgrey colspan=9|
|-
| style="text-align:left;" |Jorgie & Sylvain
| 14
| bgcolor=lightpink|29.0
| bgcolor=darkgrey colspan=9|
|}

 indicates the couple eliminated that week
 indicates the couple were in the skate-off but not eliminated
 indicates the couple were eliminated immediately (no Skate-off)
 indicates the winning couple
 indicates the runner-up couple
 indicates the third-place couple
 indicate the highest score for that week
 indicate the lowest score for that week
"—" indicates the couple(s) that did not skate that week

Average chart
This table only counts for dances scored on a traditional 40-point scale (the duel skate from week 5 and the doubled scored from week 7 are not included in the total).

Live show details
Results summary
Colour key

  Cousins did not need to vote as there was already a majority.
  Barber did not need to vote as there was already a majority.
  In Cousins' absence, Nicky Slater voted on his behalf.

Week 1 (5 January)
 Group performance: "The Best Is Yet to Come"—Michael Bublé

Save Me skates
 Bonnie & Andrei: "Baby, It's Cold Outside"—Cerys Matthews & Tom Jones
 Joe & Robin: "Flash"—Queen

 Judges' votes to save
 Barber: Bonnie & Andrei
 Roberts: Bonnie & Andrei
 Gardiner: Bonnie & Andrei
 Cousins: Did not need to vote but would have saved Bonnie & Andrei

Week 2 (12 January)
 Group performance: "Good Feeling"—Flo Rida (performed by professional skaters)

Save Me skates
 Gary & Katie: "What About Now" – Daughtry
 Sam & Vicky: "Riverdance"—from Riverdance Judges' votes to save
 Barber: Sam & Vicky
 Roberts: Sam & Vicky
 Gardiner: Sam & Vicky
 Cousins: Did not need to vote but would have saved Sam & Vicky

Week 3 (19 January)

Save Me skates
 Zaraah & Andy: "Diamonds and Pearls"—Prince
 Todd & Alex: "Help!"—The Beatles

 Judges' votes to save
 Barber: Zaraah & Andy
 Roberts: Zaraah & Andy
 Gardiner: Zaraah & Andy
 Cousins: Did not need to vote but would have saved Zaraah & Andy

Week 4 (26 January)
 Theme- Dance Week
 Torvill & Dean performance: "In My Life" (performed with Rebecca Ferguson)
 Special musical guest: Rebecca Ferguson—"All That I've Got" (accompanied by professional skaters)

Save Me skates
 Kyran & Nina: "Chasing Cars"—Snow Patrol
 Zaraah & Andy: "Don't Cry for Me Argentina"—Julie Covington

 Judges' votes to save
 Barber: Kyran & Nina
 Roberts: Kyran & Nina
 Gardiner: Zaraah & Andy
 Cousins: Kyran & Nina

Week 5 (2 February)
 Theme: The duel
 Group performance: "Bring Me to Life" (performed by professional skaters)
 Duel pairs:
 Ray & Maria vs. Suzanne & Matt
 Bonnie & Andrei vs. Gareth & Brianne
 Beth & Łukasz vs. Hayley & Daniel
 Sam & Vicky vs. Kyran & Nina

After the duels the four skaters who were not immune all performed again:
 Sam & Vicky: "Dream Catch Me"—Newton Faulkner
 Bonnie & Andrei: "Devil Gate Drive"—Suzi Quatro
 Beth & Łukasz: "Think"—Aretha Franklin
 Suzanne & Matt: "I Knew You Were Trouble"—Taylor Swift

Save Me skates
 Sam & Vicky: "Don't Stop the Music"—Jamie Cullum
 Bonnie & Andrei: "Big Spender"—from Sweet CharityJudges' votes to save
 Barber: Sam & Vicky
 Roberts: Sam & Vicky
 Gardiner: Sam & Vicky
 Cousins: Did not need to vote but would have saved Sam & Vicky

Week 6 (9 February)
 Theme: 1984 night
 Group performance: "Dr. Beat"—Miami Sound Machine/"Wild Boys"—Duran Duran
 Torvill & Dean performance: "The Power of Love"
 Note: Former judge Nicky Slater replaced Cousins for this week and next week, while Barber acted as head judge

Save Me skates
 Sam & Vicky: "Dream Catch Me"—Newton Faulkner
 Gareth & Brianne: "Beautiful Day"—U2

 Judges' votes to save
 Slater: Sam & Vicky
 Roberts: Sam & Vicky
 Gardiner: Sam & Vicky
 Barber: Did not need to vote but would have saved Sam & Vicky

Week 7 (16 February)
 Theme: Team challenge – to have their individual scores doubled
 Teams:
 Team Hayley – Hayley, Suzanne and Beth
 Team Ray – Ray, Kyran and Sam
 Group performances: "Walk Like an Egyptian"—The Bangles (Team Hayley) and "Uptown Girl"—Billy Joel (Team Ray)
 Note: As with last week, Nicky Slater replaced Cousins on the ice panel

 Judges' votes for Team challenge
 Slater: Team Ray
 Roberts: Team Ray
 Gardiner: Team Ray
 Barber: Did not need to vote but would have voted for Team Ray

Save Me skates
 Kyran & Nina: "Billie Jean"—Michael Jackson
 Suzanne & Matt: "Music"—Madonna

 Judges' votes to save
 Slater: Kyran & Nina
 Roberts: Kyran & Nina
 Gardiner: Kyran & Nina
 Barber: Did not need to vote but would have saved Kyran & Nina

Week 8 (23 February)
 Theme: Solo skate

Save Me skates
 Kyran & Nina: "Chasing Cars"—Snow Patrol
 Sam & Vicky: "Riverdance"—from Riverdance''

 Judges' votes to save
 Barber: Sam & Vicky
 Roberts: Sam & Vicky
 Gardiner: Sam & Vicky
 Cousins: Did not need to vote but would have saved Sam & Vicky

Week 9 (2 March)
 Theme: Flying
 Torvill & Dean performance: "Let's Face the Music and Dance"
 Special musical guest: Kodaline—"High Hopes" (accompanied by professional skaters)

Save Me skates
 Sam & Vicky: "Club Can't Handle Me"—Flo Rida
 Ray & Maria: "You Make It Real"—James Morrison

 Judges' votes to save
 Barber: Ray & Maria
 Roberts: Ray & Maria
 Gardiner: Ray & Maria
 Cousins: Did not need to vote but would have saved Ray & Maria

Week 10: Final (9 March)
 Themes: Showcase, Favourite skate; Boléro
 Torvill & Dean performance: "Boléro"

Ratings
Official ratings are taken from BARB.

References

Series 09
2014 British television seasons